Kyrgyzstan participated at the 2015 Summer Universiade in Gwangju, South Korea.

Competitors

Medal summary

Medal by sports

Medalists

References
 Country overview: Kyrgyzstan on the official website

2015 in Kyrgyzstani sport
Nations at the 2015 Summer Universiade